CommerceHub is one of the world’s largest commerce networks, providing software solutions to 40,000+ retailers and brands globally for drop shipping, marketplace, digital marketing, and delivery management. Generating over $50 billion in GMV annually, it provides integration and fulfillment services to both online and brick and mortar retailers, distributors, and supplier companies such The Home Depot, Nordstrom, Macy's, Lowe's, Adidas, Kohl’s, Nike, Costco, QVC, Staples, Best Buy, Meijer, drugstore.com, Walgreens, Dell, Toshiba, Sanyo, Minolta, Gateway and Little Tikes.

CommerceHub was formed in 1997 to develop e-commerce integration services for the sharing of data and business processes between trading partners.  As online retailing was developing, merchants were fulfilling orders via “virtual merchant” business models, selling online and fulfilling orders via drop shipping.  Founder Frank Poore, a logistics expert familiar with retailer order management systems, recognized the growing online business was attracting retailers that had never sold direct and would change the way retailers and manufacturers needed to communicate to make drop shipping work.

Merchant data transmitted via a value-added network (VAN) was generally formatted as electronic data interchange (EDI). Online businesses found EDI was too cumbersome to accommodate all the file formats and business rules the growing volume of e-commerce retailers required.  CommerceHub developed a web-based approach to serve e-commerce integration needs with their Universal Connection Hub, a translation engine that provides integration to translate and normalize supply chain communications, and enable electronic processing of purchase orders, change orders, and remittance confirmations in native file format.  The Universal Connection Hub supports industry communications and file format options including web browser, VPN, VAN, FTP, web services, HTTPS, EDI, XML, flat files, spreadsheets, and others.

In 1998 drop-ship fulfillment services were added to the connectivity hub to provide management and monitoring of the order fulfillment life cycle.   CommerceHub’s DropShip Master provided order tracking, visibility, and event management with automated exception alerts to customizable business rules.

In August 2000 CommerceHub received a multimillion-dollar investment from Interactive Technology Holdings, LLC, and announced the signing of a contract with iQVC, the online retailing division of QVC, to provide electronic business communications between iQVC and its participating vendors to automate management of iQVC customer service operations from point of sale through delivery.  The company became profitable in 2002 with the signing of four Top 20 retailers.  By 2003 CommerceHub had signed on 10 major e-commerce retailers and announced in 2004 that its network of integrated clients was approaching one thousand organizations representing nearly a million unique product SKUs.

CommerceHub was acquired by QK Holdings, a supply-chain management company, in an all-cash transaction, announced in August 2006.  That same year Stephen Hamlin, former vice president of operations at QVC.com, joined the company as CEO.

CommerceHub went public in 2016 and was traded on NASDAQ. In May of 2018 it was acquired for $1.1 billion by GTCR and Sycamore Partners private equity firms, who took it private.

CommerceHub acquired DSCO Inc. based out Lehi, Utah in November of 2020. A month later, in December 2020, Insight Partners acquired a majority stake in CommerceHub for an estimated $1.9 billion.

in 2022 CommerceHub acquired ChannelAdvisor, a provider of cloud-based ecommerce solutions that enable brands and retailers to increase global sales.

The CommerceHub headquarters is located in Latham, New York.

References

Internet properties established in 1997
Companies established in 1997
Companies based in Albany, New York
Technology companies of the United States
Corporate spin-offs